Buyoga is a town and sector in the Rulindo district of Northern Province, Rwanda.

Populated places in Rwanda